Laifour is a commune in the Ardennes department in northern France. It is situated on the river Meuse. Laifour station has rail connections to Charleville-Mézières and Givet.

Population

See also
Communes of the Ardennes department

References

Communes of Ardennes (department)
Ardennes communes articles needing translation from French Wikipedia